Narodnoye Slovo (People's Word) is a Russian language newspaper published from Uzbekistan. It is run by the government. The paper has an Uzbek language sister publication, Khalq Sozi.

References

External links
Narodnoye Slovo Official Site

Publications with year of establishment missing
Russian-language newspapers published in Uzbekistan